Events in 2008 in anime.

Events
In this year, 288 anime television programs were produced and home video sales of anime DVDs, Blu-ray Discs and HD DVDs in Japan were worth 77.9 billion yen. Animation studio 8-Bit was founded in September.

Accolades
At the Mainichi Film Awards, The Sky Crawlers won the Animation Film Award and Ponyo won the Ōfuji Noburō Award. Ponyo also won the Japan Academy Prize for Animation of the Year; the other nominees were Doraemon: Nobita and the Green Giant Legend 2008, The Sky Crawlers, Detective Conan: Full Score of Fear and One Piece - The Movie: Episode of Chopper Plus: Bloom in the Winter, Miracle Sakura. Internationally, La Maison en Petits Cubes won the Academy Award for Best Animated Short Film and Le Cristal d'Annecy at the Annecy International Animated Film Festival. Sword of the Stranger was nominated for the Asia Pacific Screen Award for Best Animated Feature Film. Ponyo and The Sky Crawlers were in competition for the Golden Lion at the 65th Venice International Film Festival.

Releases

Films
A list of anime that debuted in theaters between January 1 and December 31, 2008.

Television series
A list of anime television series that debuted between January 1 and December 31, 2008.

Original net animations
A list of original net animations that debuted between January 1 and December 31, 2008.

Original video animations
A list of original video animations that debuted between January 1 and December 31, 2008.

See also
2008 in Japanese television
2008 Kosovo declaration of independence
2008 in television
2008 in animation

References

External links 
Japanese animated works of the year, listed in the IMDb

Years in anime
2008 in animation
2008 in Japan